The New Jersey Classic is a race for Standardbred racehorses run annually since 1980 at the Meadowlands Racetrack in East Rutherford, New Jersey. Open to New Jersey-sired 3-Year-Old Colt & Gelding pacers, it is run over a distance of one mile.

Historical race events
1981 Classic winner Caramore was bred and owned by Father Thomas J. O'Connor, pastor at St. Robert Bellarmine Catholic Church in Freehold Township, New Jersey who owned and bred more than eighty horses.

Records 
 Most wins by a driver
 5 – John Campbell (1980, 1989, 1994, 2006, 2007) &  Michel Lachance (1990, 1998, 1999, 2001, 2003)

 Most wins by a trainer
 3 – William G. Robinson (1983, 1993, 1994) & Brett Pelling (1998, 1999, 2005) & James Dean (2011, 2012, 2015)

 Stakes record
 1:47 2/5 – Panther Hanover (2012)

New Jersey Classic Pace winners

References

Recurring sporting events established in 1980
Harness races for three-year-old pacers
Harness racing in the United States
Horse races in New Jersey
Sports in East Rutherford, New Jersey
1980 establishments in New Jersey